Passy Peak is a peak of elevation 510 m in Vidin Heights on Varna Peninsula, Livingston Island in the South Shetland Islands, Antarctica.  Surmounting Panega Glacier to the southeast, Rose Valley Glacier to the northeast, and Saedinenie Snowfield to the northwest.  The peak is named after Solomon Passy (b. 1956) in appreciation of his role in organizing the Bulgarian Antarctic campaigns and the upgrade of St. Kliment Ohridski base in 1993–96.

Location

Maps
 L.L. Ivanov et al. Antarctica: Livingston Island and Greenwich Island, South Shetland Islands. Scale 1:100000 topographic map. Sofia: Antarctic Place-names Commission of Bulgaria, 2005.
 L.L. Ivanov. Antarctica: Livingston Island and Greenwich, Robert, Snow and Smith Islands. Scale 1:120000 topographic map.  Troyan: Manfred Wörner Foundation, 2009.

References
 Passy Peak. SCAR Composite Antarctic Gazetteer
 Bulgarian Antarctic Gazetteer. Antarctic Place-names Commission. (details in Bulgarian, basic data in English)

External links
 Passy Peak. Copernix satellite image

Mountains of Livingston Island